Rowlands Gill is a town situated along the A694, between Winlaton Mill and Hamsterley Mill, on the north bank of the River Derwent, in the Metropolitan Borough of Gateshead, Tyne and Wear, England. Within Gateshead's greenbelt, the town has a picturesque setting with much open space and views across the valley to Gibside Estate, now owned by the National Trust.

History
With the coming of the Derwent Valley Railway in 1867, Rowlands Gill became an economically viable coal mining village, and later a semi-rural dormitory suburb of commercial and industrial Tyneside. An independent village within Blaydon Urban District, in County Durham, it became incorporated into the County of Tyne and Wear and the Metropolitan Borough of Gateshead in 1974.

Local politics
In local government Rowlands Gill is located mainly within the ward of Chopwell and Rowlands Gill. It is served by three councillors, all of whom are Labour councillors, except for the north end at Lockhaugh, which falls within the ward of Winlaton and High Spen, and is served by two Liberal Democrat councillors. Gateshead Council is Labour-controlled.

Rowlands Gill is in the parliamentary constituency of Blaydon. The MP is Labour's Liz Twist.

Geography

Rowlands Gill is situated within Gateshead's Greenbelt, 6.2 miles southwest of Newcastle just outside of the Tyneside urban sprawl. Transport in the area is mainly focused on Buses as the nearest railway station is Blaydon railway station, 3 miles to the north, and is further away from any Tyne and Wear Metro stations. The village lies on the A694, known as 'Station Road' in the village centre. Another nearby major road is the A692 that passes through the nearby areas of Byermoor and Hobson, County Durham.

Retail and facilities
The village has two licensed premises, the Vale of Derwent Working Mens Club and a "micro pub", The Railway Tavern. The Towneley Arms Public House pre-dated the village, being built in 1835 to serve travellers and their horses on the turnpike road through the valley. It was rebuilt in 1961, but due to low business, demolished in 2002 and replaced with dwellings. There are plentiful dining/alehouse facilities in the surrounding villages of Winlaton Mill, Burnopfield & Winlaton.

The village has a GP with four medical doctors, a dental surgery and a chemist shop. There is a barber, two other hairdressers, two art shops, a gym, a post office, a grocer, a florist, a pet shop, a garage, and an appliance shop. It also has an estate agent, an accountant, a bookmaker and a mortician.

There is an Italian restaurant, a Chinese restaurant/take-away, a tea-shop, a sandwich shop, and a fish and chip shop.

A public library is near the village centre. Strathmore Road Methodist Church and St. Barnabas Church of England Church are near the centre.

The war memorial is a Grade II listed building.

Recreation and education
Derwent Park provides access to the river, where permit holders can fish. It also has tennis courts, a putting green, recreational fields and playground facilities. The Derwent Country Walk runs through the village along the route of the disused railway line.

The A694 runs through the town. There are frequent bus services to Newcastle City Centre, the MetroCentre and, in the other direction, Blackhall Mill and Consett. Other minor bus routes such as UCall bus service operate.

Rowlands Gill has a primary school, which was rebuilt in 2007 after the previously separate infant and junior schools had merged. The school is a feeder to Thorp Academy. Some parents send their children to St Thomas More Catholic School, Blaydon.

Rowlands Gill and the surrounding Derwent Valley were chosen by the Northern Kites Project as the location for re-introducing red kites in semi-rural areas. The scheme has proved to be a success, with birds being spotted across the west of the borough, from Crawcrook through Rowlands Gill, to Burnopfield and Whickham.

Notable people
These notable people were born in Rowlands Gill or lived there for a significant period:
Kirsty Wade – athlete, a former resident of the old station-master's house
Chris Ryan – SAS soldier and author
Frank Clark – European Cup-winning football player and manager
Ben Satterley – wrestler currently under contract to the WWE, was billed as being from Rowlands Gill when wrestling in the North East.
Richard Cobbing – athlete, Olympian, former World Games Trampoline champion and World Championship Silver Medallist at the FIS Freestyle World Ski Championships
Daniel Barlaser – footballer for Newcastle United
Edward Charlton – British Army soldier awarded the Victoria Cross during World War II
Arthur Carty – academic and former National Science Adviser to the Government of Canada

References

External links

 
Villages in Tyne and Wear
Gateshead